C. erecta may refer to:

 Chalciope erecta, a moth species found in Africa
 Commelina erecta, the white mouth dayflower or slender dayflower, a perennial herb species native throughout the Americas

See also
 Erecta